Niki Gudex (Guildford, England) is an Australian professional mountain biker from Sydney. She competes in both downhill and cross country disciplines.

In addition to being a professional mountainbiker, Gudex is also a model and a graphic designer. In the Australian edition of FHM magazine she has been listed in the 100 Sexiest Women in the World in 2002, 2003, 2004, 2005 and 2006.

References

External links
 Niki Gudex's Website

Australian female cyclists
Living people
Sportspeople from Guildford
Year of birth missing (living people)